Rainbow Brite is a 1980s animated series based on Hallmark's media franchise of the same name. Produced by DIC Enterprises with animation provided by Japanese TMS Entertainment, the show began as a part of DIC's Kideo TV syndicated anthology package. In the series, Rainbow Brite uses her magical belt to protect the colors of Rainbowland from the bumbling Murky & Lurky.

Premise
A young girl named Wisp is brought to a dark, desolate land with the mission to bring color to this fictional world by locating the "Sphere of Light". Along the way, she befriends a sprite named Twink and a talking horse named Starlite. She also finds a mysterious baby who turns out to be the key to her mission. With the help of her new friends, Wisp locates the legendary Color Belt and rescues the seven Color Kids, who had been trapped by the King of Shadows. Using the Color Belt, Wisp defeats the King of Shadows, liberates the sprites, and brings color and beauty to the land, henceforth called Rainbow Land. Wisp is renamed Rainbow Brite by the Sphere of Light in recognition of her leadership role over the Color Kids. Together, Rainbow Brite and the Color Kids are responsible for managing all the colors in the universe.

The Color Kids spread color across the universe from the Color Console inside the Color Castle. Each member of the Color Kids is responsible for a specific color. They each have a personal sprite, and are in charge of several sprites that extract Color Crystals from nearby caves. These crystals are processed into Star Sprinkles which are the essential components to brightening and coloring any object or place. Rainbow Brite and the Color Kids' mission is often complicated by the likes of Murky Dismal, his sidekick Lurky, and other villains. Brian, a boy from Earth, sometimes assists Rainbow Brite in her adventures.

In the movie Rainbow Brite and the Star Stealer, the setting expands to include the diamond planet Spectra. All the light in the universe passes through Spectra before coming to Earth. However, Earth soon falls into wintry darkness when the diamond-obsessed Dark Princess decides to steal Spectra for her own. Rainbow Brite and her horse Starlite must team with Spectra's boy warrior Krys and his robotic horse On-X to defeat the powers of darkness and save Spectra, Earth, and the universe.

Characters

Main Characters 

 Rainbow Brite (voiced by Bettina Bush) is the protagonist of the series. Her mission is to make the world brighter and hearts lighter by replacing darkness with color and light. Rainbow Brite is aided in her adventures in Rainbow Land by her faithful companions Starlite and Twink. In the 2014 reboot, she is referred to as a Sentinel of Light.
 Twink (voiced by Robbie Lee) – Rainbow Brite's loyal friend and personal sprite. Twink is in charge of all the sprites in the Color Caves and is frequently left in charge when Rainbow Brite is away. Twink was originally a red Sprite until Murky Dismal removed his colour, leaving him white. In the 2014 reboot, he is known as Mr.Glitters.
 Starlite (voiced by Andre Stojka) – Rainbow Brite's faithful friend and an egotistical talking horse. Starlite sails through the skies by galloping on rainbows but in some episodes and books, he flies without wings or any other means of propulsion. Starlite is strong, fast, courageous, and typically quite perceptive, though he can be extremely jealous if he perceives another horse as competition.

Color Kids 
 Red Butler (voiced by Mona Marshall) – Red Butler is in charge of the color red. Red Butler's personality is adventurous and daring. He is always up for new adventures and ever-ready to rescue anyone in distress, but his dashing and daring personality can also be his weakness. Though Red is usually a charming talker, the long-winded stories of his heroic pursuits can bore the other Color Kids. He is a skilled trumpet player. The name and character are derived from "Rhett Butler", one of the main protagonists in Margaret Mitchell's Gone With the Wind.
 Lala Orange (voiced by Robbie Lee) – She is in charge of the color orange. Lala Orange's personality is romantic and stylish. A fashion-oriented, type-A personality, Lala can come off as a little pushy and overbearing sometimes, though she usually means well. Lala harbours a secret crush on Red Butler.
 Canary Yellow (voiced by Mona Marshall) – She is in charge of the color yellow. Canary Yellow's personality is cheerful and optimistic. Her laid back and easy going nature can make her naïve at times, making her an easy target for Murky Dismal. Canary Yellow is a skilled flute player and a dancer.
 Patty O'Green (voiced by Mona Marshall) – She is in charge of the color green. Patty O'Green's personality is mischievous and lively. Patty enjoys playing practical jokes on her friends, though her genuine sweetness usually forgives any upset. She loves life and nature. She can be prideful at times and has been known to brag that life on Earth couldn't thrive without her color. Patty is a skilled clarinet player (Murky's Comet).
 Buddy Blue (voiced by Pat Fraley) – He is in charge of the color blue. Buddy Blue's personality is athletic and valiant. He lives and breathes physical fitness and excels in every sport. If Buddy's not playing sports or working out, he's likely to be found meditating in the peace and calm of the blue skies and waters of Rainbow Land. He always makes an effort to bring peace and order to any conflict among his friends. Buddy is a skilled tuba player.
 Indigo (voiced by Robbie Lee) – She is in charge of the color indigo. Indigo's personality is dramatic and creative. She is a performer at heart, often making grand entrances in imaginative costumes or reciting lines from well-known plays. More than anything, Indigo wants to be an actress and is often seen rehearsing for her big break. Some find her overly dramatic or call her a dreamer, but Indigo thinks of herself as an artist with aspirations. She also plays the drums. She is the only non-white Color Kid.
 Shy Violet (voiced by Robbie Lee) – She is in charge of the color violet. Shy Violet's personality is intellectual and resourceful. She can often be found reading, writing, or working on her theories about color. Shy Violet is Rainbow Brite's go-to Color Kid for problem-solving. Though Violet is extremely shy, she never hesitates to speak up when offering advice; and when she speaks, the other Color Kids listen.
 Tickled Pink (voiced by Rhonda Aldrich) – Tickled Pink is in charge of mixing Color Crystals and creating pastels and other new colors like aqua, magenta, etc. She's in charge of the female Sprites, but like Stormy does not have a personal Sprite. Tickled Pink is a talented baton twirler. Along with Moonglow and Stormy, Tickled Pink was designed by Mattel rather than Hallmark.

Color Kids' Personal Sprites 
 Romeo – Red Butler's sprite. He is in charge of the red sprites that mine red Color Crystals which are processed into red Star Sprinkles. Romeo can be extremely affectionate, even toward Rainbow Land's villains.
 O.J. – Lala Orange's sprite. He is in charge of the orange sprites that mine orange Color Crystals which are processed into orange Star Sprinkles. His name is a reference to orange juice.
 Spark – Canary Yellow's sprite. He is in charge of the yellow sprites who mine yellow Color Crystals which are processed into yellow Star Sprinkles.
 Lucky – Patty O'Green's sprite. He is in charge of the green sprites that mine green Color Crystals which are processed into green Star Sprinkles.
 Champ – Buddy Blue's sprite. He is in charge of the blue sprites that mine blue Color Crystals which are processed into blue Star Sprinkles.
 Hammy – Indigo's sprite. He is in charge of the indigo sprites that mine indigo Color Crystals which are processed into indigo Star Sprinkles. The name comes from Indigo frequently 'hamming it up' in her dramatic productions.
 I.Q. – Shy Violet's sprite. He is in charge of the violet sprites that mine violet Color Crystals which are processed into violet Star Sprinkles.
 Dee Lite – Tickled Pink's sprite. She helps mix Color Crystals to make other colors like aqua, magenta, etc.

Other Rainbow Land characters
 Baby Brite – Alternate guise of the Sphere of Light. When Rainbow Brite was sent to locate the Sphere of Light in her very first mission to make the world a brighter and happier place, she encountered Baby Brite. After rescuing her, Rainbow Brite discovered the infant was the powerful Sphere of Light she was sent to find. As the Sphere of Light, Baby Brite helped Rainbow Brite eliminate the King of Shadows, thus creating Rainbow Land.
 Puppy Brite & Kitty Brite – Rainbow Brite's non-talking pet dog and cat.
 Moonglow (voiced by Rhonda Aldrich) – Moonglow is in charge of making the night sky beautiful. Her powers facilitate the placement, brightness, and colors of starlight, auroras, meteors, spiral galaxies, nebulæ, and the moon itself.  Even at her most wide-eyed and alert, Moonglow speaks in a sleepy monotone. Moonglow was designed by Mattel rather than Hallmark.
 Nite Sprite – Moonglow's personal Sprite assists her in making the night sky beautiful.
 Shimmer – She is a blue horse with a violet mane and tail, and a violet crescent moon on her forehead.
 Stormy (voiced by Marissa Mendenhall) – Stormy lives in the clouds and is in charge of storms and all other forms of bad weather. Her powers facilitate thunder, lightning, rain, winds, ice, and snow. Unlike the Color Kids, Stormy can be cynical at times. In the 2014 reboot, Stormy initially aligns herself with Lurky, Murky Dismal, and the Dark Princess against Rainbow Brite. Stormy was designed by Mattel rather than Hallmark.
 Skydancer – Skydancer is a horse that flies and gallops through the clouds as Stormy casts her storms throughout Rainbow Land. Skydancer is deep purple with a lavender mane and tail, and a white thunderbolt between the eyes. Unlike Starlite, Skydancer does not speak.
 Sunriser – A wild pink horse with a magenta mane and tail, and a golden sun on her forehead. Sunriser lives in the mountains of Rainbow Land and is only seen at sunrise. Unlike Starlite, Sunriser does not speak. Sunriser admires and is very affectionate toward Starlite. Sunriser was designed by Mattel rather than Hallmark.
 Krys (voiced by David Mendenhall) – The wearer of the Prism. A boy warrior from planet Spectra. He was a bit misogynistic when he first encountered Rainbow Brite, though she soon proved him wrong about her courage and capability. Krys became a trusted friend and ally to Rainbow Brite, and with her help defeated the Dark Princess.  In the 2014 reboot, Krys is an ancestor of Brian who once wielded a powerful magic ring that empowered him as a Sentinel of Light, the protector of Light Unseen.
 On-X – (voiced by Pat Fraley) Krys's robotic horse. Formerly Orin's steed, On-X helps Krys and Rainbow Brite foil the Dark Princess's evil plans to pluck the diamond planet Spectra from the stars in her caper to steal the greatest diamond in the Universe. On-X speaks with a robotic voice, hovers in place, and has the ability to fly using rockets in his legs. He appears black with crimson eyes and a prætorian style mane.
 Orin (voiced by Les Tremayne) – An elder Sprite from the planet Spectra. Orin plays a pivotal role in uniting Rainbow Brite and Krys against the Dark Princess. Orin is a light gray Sprite with a white handlebar mustache. He wears a blue cape and carries a wooden walking stick.
 Spectran Sprites – Bombo, Popo, and other Spectran Sprites are native to the diamond planet Spectra. Unlike Rainbow Land Sprites, they have spherical antennæ. Their furry feet are useful in polishing the surface of Spectra. Many wear goggles and are of lighter, cool colors like ice blue, lavender, and gray.

Villains
 Murky Dismal (voiced by Peter Cullen) – The primary antagonist throughout most of the series, he is at various times under the employ of the Dark Princess and the King of Shadows. He resides in the last, lone dark area of Rainbow Land called the Pits with his clumsy sidekick Lurky. Murky is constantly trying to foil Rainbow Brite's mission by capturing Color Crystals, the Sprites, the Color Kids, or Rainbow Brite's Color Belt. His full name is Murkwell Dismal, and he is both clever and incompetent as a villain. Murky is over 700 years old.
 Lurky (voiced by Pat Fraley) – Murky Dismal's imposing but dimwitted sidekick. He somewhat resembles a giant brown Sprite with a large, furry nose. Unlike Murky, Lurky frequently delights in "all the pretty colors!" Lurky is generally good natured and usually if unintentionally, foils Murky's plans through his clumsy nature. Despite his size, clumsiness, and association with Murky, Lurky is rather gentle. Murky often refers to Lurky as Banana Brain, Cabbage Brain, Pancake Brain, or some variation thereof.
 Robot Brite (voiced by Bettina Bush) – Murky Dismal's robotic Rainbow Brite double was Robot Brite, who was created to impersonate Rainbow Brite in a ruse to rob the Color Caves of all their Color Crystals.
 The King of Shadows – A dark and mysterious being who ruled Rainbow Land before Rainbow Brite's arrival, when the world was still a dark and desolate wasteland filled with monstrous beasts. He imprisoned the seven Color Kids in different locations across the land. The King of Shadows' tyrannical rule ended when he was destroyed by Rainbow Brite.
 The Dark Princess (voiced by Rhonda Aldrich) – The Dark Princess lives in a palace in space and tries to steal the diamond planet Spectra. She is spoiled and greedy, even going so far as to steal Rainbow's Color Belt after witnessing its power. She has a magic jewel that is the source of her power, though it is destroyed due to the combined power of Krys and Rainbow Brite. The Dark Princess is next seen descending upon the Color Caves announcing herself as Queen of the Sprites in a bid to force the Sprites to mine for diamonds. She dresses in black with a bejeweled golden headdress adorning her auburn hair. The Dark Princess often carries a pomeranian-sized diamond on a leash like a pet and employs many underlings to do her bidding. The character returns in the 2014 reboot voiced by Molly Ringwald.
 Count Blogg (voiced by Jonathan Harris) – The Dark Princess's right-hand man. He is green skinned with pupil-less red eyes, a long gray beard and fangs.
 Sgt. Zombo (voiced by David Workman) – Warden of the Prison Planet and minion of the Dark Princess. He has purple skin and wears partial plate armor with what appears to be a military uniform. His eyes are deep purple with yellow pupils.
 Glitterbots – Large golden robots charged with keeping the Sprites of Spectra under control by order of Sgt. Zombo. Glitterbots enslave prisoners through ocular Hypno-beams, powered by large crimson jewels embedded in their skulls.

Humans
 Brian (voiced by Scott Menville) – Brian is an 11-year-old Earth boy. He is often accompanied by his dog, Sam, and is the only person on Earth who can see Rainbow Brite. After befriending Rainbow Brite, Brian was given a key to access Rainbow Land from any lock. Despite initial feelings of competitiveness and inadequacy toward Red Butler and the other Color Kids, Brian has proven himself a trusted and valiant ally time and again. In the 2014 reboot, Rainbow Brite discovers Brian is a descendant of Krys. When he jumps in front of a blast meant for Rainbow Brite, his powers activate, transforming him into a Sentinel of Light in a suit very similar to Krys.

Episodes

Season 1 (1984)

Season 2 (1985)

References

External links

 

1984 American television series debuts
1986 American television series endings
1984 French television series debuts
1986 French television series endings
1980s American animated television series
1980s French animated television series
American children's animated adventure television series
American children's animated fantasy television series
French children's animated adventure television series
French children's animated fantasy television series
Japanese children's animated adventure television series
Japanese children's animated fantasy television series
Anime-influenced Western animated television series
English-language television shows
First-run syndicated television programs in the United States
Hallmark Cards
Kideo TV
Television series by DIC Entertainment
Television shows based on Mattel toys
Animated television series about orphans